Harry Clinton "Huck" Wallace (July 27, 1882 – July 9, 1951), nicknamed "Lefty", was a pitcher in Major League Baseball. He played for the Philadelphia Phillies in 1912. In four career games, he allowed seven hits in 4.2 innings. He had an ERA of 0.00 while allowing 5 runs, all unearned. Wallace threw left and batted left. He was born in Richmond, Indiana, in 1882 and died in Cleveland, Ohio, in 1951. Along with the nickname "Huck", Wallace was also nicknamed "Lefty", because he was left-handed.

References

External links

1882 births
1951 deaths
Major League Baseball pitchers
Philadelphia Phillies players
Baseball players from Indiana
Sportspeople from Richmond, Indiana
Minor league baseball managers
Davenport River Rats players
Connellsville Cokers players
Uniontown Coal Barons players
Trenton Tigers players
Reading Pretzels players
Lancaster Red Roses players
Lancaster Lanks players
Atlantic City Lanks players
York White Roses players